Flor Van den Eynden (born 29 July 2000) is a Belgian professional footballer who plays as a centre-back for Eerste Divisie club Helmond Sport. He was included in The Guardian's "Next Generation 2017" of the 60 best young talents in world football.

Club career

Eindhoven
Van den Eynden played youth football for KFC Lille, Westerlo, Beerschot, Mechelen and the Italian club Inter Milan. 

In 2019, he joined Dutch second-tier Eerste Divisie club Eindhoven on a free transfer, signing a two-year contract. He made his debut for the club on 27 September 2019 in a 4–1 home win against Telstar, coming off the bench in the 88th minute for Samy Bourard. He scored his first goal for Eindhoven in the 4–0 cup victory against Rijnsburgse Boys. After two seasons, his contract with Eindhoven expired. Afterwards, he was on trial with Lierse Kempenzonen and Lommel, but this did not result in a contract.

During the 2021–22 season, Van den Eynden played for the under-21 team of Mechelen, sometimes playing alongside his brother, Bas Van den Eynden as a centre-back.

Helmond Sport
On 25 May 2022, Van den Eynden signed a two-year contract with Eerste Divisie club Helmond Sport, with an option for an additional year.

Career statistics

References

2000 births
Living people
Belgian footballers
Belgium youth international footballers
Belgian expatriate footballers
Association football defenders
K.V.C. Westerlo players
Beerschot A.C. players
K.V. Mechelen players
Inter Milan players
FC Eindhoven players
Helmond Sport players
Eerste Divisie players
Belgian expatriate sportspeople in Italy
Expatriate footballers in Italy
Belgian expatriate sportspeople in the Netherlands
Expatriate footballers in the Netherlands
People from Herentals
Footballers from Antwerp Province